Rangeela  is a 1995 Indian Hindi-language romantic comedy film written, directed and produced by Ram Gopal Varma. It stars Urmila Matondkar, Aamir Khan, and Jackie Shroff. The film was A. R. Rahman's debut Hindi film with an original score and soundtrack, as his previous Hindi releases were dubbed versions of his Tamil, Malayalam and Telugu films.

Rangeela released on 8 September 1995, and proved to be a major box office success. The film received critical acclaim upon release, with particular praise directed towards the film's soundtrack and Matondkar's performance, thus proving to be a breakthrough for her. It was screened at the mainstream section of the International Film Festival of India. 

At the 41st Filmfare Awards, Rangeela received a leading 14 nominations, Best Film, Best Director (Varma), Best Actor (Khan) and Best Actress (Matondkar), and won 7 awards, including Best Supporting Actor (Shroff), Best Music Director (Rahman) and Special Jury Award (Asha Bhosle for "Tanha Tanha").

Plot 
A street-toughened orphan by the name of Munna (Aamir Khan) is befriended by some kind folks, whose effervescent daughter Mili (Urmila Matondkar) soon grows to be his best buddy. Both gravitate toward the Mumbai movie industry. While Mili finds occupation as a movie extra, Munna earns his livelihood selling movie tickets in the black market.

Mili has ambitions of becoming an actress. Fortune glances her way when she dances her way into a movie star's attention. This actor, Raj Kamal (Jackie Shroff), arranges for her to be auditioned for the heroine's role in his upcoming film called Rangeela. Mili's shortcomings amount to distractions, but thanks in no small way to Munna and Raj, she lands the role.

Raj and Munna both fall for Mili, but Mili is too busy making the movie to notice any of this. She starts spending a lot of time with Raj during the filming. Munna tries many times to tell Mili that he loves her, but he is unable to, or Raj gets in the way. Eventually, feeling inferior, Munna decides to leave Mili to Raj, who can give her a better life than he can. The matter is not resolved though, as Mili hears of this on the film's opening night. She asks Raj to help her find Munna, which he does after realizing that Mili seems to love Munna and not him.

Mili stops Munna midway, misunderstandings get cleared up and the lovers unite.

Cast 

 Urmila Matondkar as Mili Joshi
 Aamir Khan as Munna
 Jackie Shroff as Raj Kamal
 Gulshan Grover as Steven Kapoor
 Avtar Gill as P.C.
 Reema Lagoo as Mrs. Joshi (Mili's mother)
 Achyut Potdar as Mr. Joshi (Mili's father)
 Rajesh Joshi as Pakya
 Neeraj Vora as Drunk party guest (bluffer)
 Rajeev Mehta as Restaurant Steward
 Nitin Chandrakant Desai
 Ram Mohan as Make-Up Dada
 Shammi as Gulbadan's mother
 Tarun as Tough guy at the shooting
 Suman as Motilal
 Himanshu
 Aditya Narayan as grown up himself (singing in the song "Rangeela Re Remake")
 Saroj Khan as herself (choreographer)
 Remo D'Souza as a background dancer in title song
 Shefali Chhaya as Mala Malhotra (special appearance) Shooting Tara (TV series)
 Madhur Bhandarkar in a special appearance

Reception 
Rangeela opened to critical acclaim and was declared a “superhit” at the box office, grossing 334 million. It was also the fourth biggest grosser of 1995. Urmila Matondkar became an overnight sensation and a superstar. Her fame and star status were bolstered by hits like "Tanha Tanha" and "Rangeela Re". The costume designer of the film Manish Malhotra also received instant fame. The film proved to be a turning point for Khan's career, whose chemistry with Urmila was also appreciated. The choreography of Rangeela also deserves a special mention. The amazing dance sequences led by choreographers Ahmed Khan and Saroj Khan were considered classic and appealing. Rangeela's music was also highly successful that helped the film to achieve victory at the box office. The lead actor, Aamir Khan stopped attending award shows after this film after he lost the Best Actor award to Shah Rukh Khan who won the Dilwale Dulhania Le Jayenge.

Awards 

 41st Filmfare Awards:

Won

 Best Supporting Actor – Jackie Shroff
 Best Music Director – A. R. Rahman
 Best Story – Ram Gopal Varma
 Best Choreography – Ahmed Khan for "Rangeela Re"
 Best Costume Design – Manish Malhotra
 Special Award –  Asha Bhosle for "Tanha Tanha"

Nominated

 Best Film
 Best Director – Ram Gopal Varma
 Best Actor – Aamir Khan
 Best Actress – Urmila Matondkar
 Best Lyricist – Mehboob for "Kya Kare Kya Na Kare"
 Best Lyricist – Mehboob for "Tanha Tanha"
 Best Female Playback Singer – Kavita Krishnamurthy for "Pyaar Yeh Jaane"
 Best Female Playback Singer – Shweta Shetty for "Mangta Hai Kya"

Production 
Ram Gopal Varma once loved a woman named Satya Polavarapu, who he claims did not love him back since she preferred a wealthier, better looking man; this inspired him to write Rangeela.

Soundtrack 

The soundtrack featured 7 songs composed by A. R. Rahman with lyrics penned by Mehboob and an instrumental theme song. The audio was released in September 1995 by Rahman's mother Kareema. It is listed in almost all lists of best Bollywood soundtracks.

The soundtrack fetched Rahman two filmfare awards, Filmfare Award for Best Music Director and Filmfare R. D. Burman Award for New Music Talent. Mehboob got two nominations for Filmfare Award for Best Lyricist, for the tracks "Kya Kare" and "Tanha Tanha". Swarnalatha, Shweta Shetty and Kavita Krishnamurthy were nominated for Filmfare Award for Best Female Playback Singer for their respective tracks.

Asha Bhosle received the Filmfare Special Award that year for her rendition of the song "Tanha Tanha".

The song "Yaaro Sun Lo Zara" was originally composed for a Telugu film Super Police (1994) as "Baabu Love Cheyyara". The soundtrack was also released in Tamil, with title Rangeela itself and lyrics penned by Vairamuthu. However, the reused track "Yaaro Sun Lo Zara" was not included in the Tamil version. The soundtrack rights are now acquired by Tips Music Company.

Hindi

Tamil (dubbed version) 
All the tracks were written by Vairamuthu.

Telugu (dubbed version)

Cultural significance 

Rangeela is considered to be a cult classic in history of Bollywood. 

Despite the film's huge success, It was still regarded as a film ahead of its time as the films made during the early 1990s had dated plots and storylines. Shekhar Kapur called it 'The film of the 21st Century with great music and visuals' at the screening of the film. The look and presentation of Urmila Matondkar in the film became the talk of the town as it re-invented the image of the Bollywood Heroine. Aamir Khan played an unusual character of a Mumbaiya Tapori in the early stages of his career and that proved to be the milestone for him. A. R. Rahman's music of the film became such a rage that it topped the charts for almost a decade. The songs still remain popular as they have a fresh feel. The film established careers of so many technicians and the people who worked behind the camera.

References

External links 
 

1990s Hindi-language films
1995 films
Films shot in Rajasthan
Films directed by Ram Gopal Varma
Films scored by A. R. Rahman
Films about Bollywood
1990s romantic comedy-drama films
Indian romantic comedy-drama films
1995 comedy films
1995 drama films